Thomas Holtzmann (1 April 1927 – 4 January 2013) was a German stage and film actor. He appeared in more than forty films from 1955 to 2004.

Filmography

References

External links 

1927 births
2013 deaths
German male film actors
German male stage actors
Commanders Crosses of the Order of Merit of the Federal Republic of Germany